Huang Dao (April 25, 1900 – May 23, 1939) original name Huang Duanzhang, also known as Yiming was a member of the Chinese Workers' and Peasants' Red Army and the New Fourth Army. He was born in Hengfeng County, Jiangxi Province. He was the father of Huang Zhizhen, who was governor of Hubei Province under the People's Republic of China. He fought in the Chinese Civil War on the side of the Communist Party of China, being active in northern and eastern Fujian near the border with Zhejiang. He remained in southern China after the Long March. During the Second Sino-Japanese War, he was poisoned by the Kuomintang en route to southern Anhui.

References

1900 births
1939 deaths
Chinese communists
Beijing Normal University alumni
Chinese Red Army generals
New Fourth Army generals
People from Shangrao
Generals from Jiangxi
Deaths by poisoning